"Wa Da Da" is a song recorded by South Korean girl group Kep1er for their debut extended play (EP) First Impact. It was released as the title track on January 3, 2022, by Wake One Entertainment.

Background and release
Kep1er was originally scheduled to debut on December 14, 2021, with their first EP First Impact, with pre-orders beginning on November 29. However, it was announced that the group's scheduled debut had been delayed to January 3, 2022, due to one of their staff members having tested positive for COVID-19. On December 14, it was revealed that group members Mashiro and Xiaoting tested positive for COVID-19. On December 26, Kep1er's agency announced that Xiaoting and Mashiro have fully recovered from COVID-19.

On January 3, 2022, the song was released together with its accompanying music video.

Composition
"Wa Da Da" was written by BuildingOwner (PrismFilter), Elum (PrismFilter), and Shannon, Danke, Hwang Yu-bin, Odal Park, Lee Seu-ran, and Kako, composed by BuildingOwner (PrismFilter), Elum (PrismFilter), and Shannon,  and arranged by BuildingOwner (PrismFilter). Musically, the group is described as "dance song based on big room house genre" with lyrics about "Kep1er's bold aspiration to become the best and the promise to repay [their] fans who have supported and protected the nine girls' dreams". "Wa Da Da" was composed in the key of B-flat major, with a tempo of 126 beats per minute.

Commercial performance
"Wa Da Da" debuted at position 130 on South Korea's Gaon Digital Chart in the chart issue dated January 9–15, 2022, ascending to position 79 in the chart issue dated January 30 – February 5, 2022. The song also debuted at position 21 on Gaon Download Chart in the chart issue dated January 2–8, 2022. On the Billboard K-pop Hot 100, the song debuted at position 84  in the chart issue dated January 5, 2022, ascending to position 71 in the following week. In Japan, the song debuted at position 20 on the Billboard Japan Japan Hot 100 in the chart issue dated January 12, 2022, ascending to position 9 in the chart issue dated January 26, 2022. The song also debuted at position 21 on the Oricon Combined Singles in the chart issue dated January 17, 2022, ascending to position 10 in the following week.

In New Zealand, the song debuted at position 24 on RMNZ Hot Singles in the chart issue dated January 10, 2022. In Singapore, the song debuted at position 11 on the RIAS Top Streaming Chart in the chart issue dated January 7–13, 2022. The song also debuted at position 11 on the RIAS Top Regional Chart in the chart issue dated December 31, 2021 – January 6, 2022, ascending to position 3 in the chart issue dated January 7–13, 2022. In Vietnam, the song debuted at position 73 on the Billboard Vietnam Vietnam Hot 100 in the chart issue dated January 20, 2022.

In the United States, the song debuted at position 13 on the Billboard World Digital Song Sales in the chart issue dated January 15, 2022. Globally, the song debuted at position 117 on the Billboard Global 200 in the chart issue dated January 22, 2022, ascending to position 77 in the following week. The song also debuted at position 171 on the Billboard Global Excl. U.S. in the chart issue dated January 15, 2022, ascending to position 60 in the chart issue dated January 22, 2022.

Promotion
Prior to the extended play's release, on January 3, 2022, Kep1er held a debut showcase to introduce the extended play and its song including "Wa Da Da". Following the release of the extended play, the group performed "Wa Da Da" on three music programs on the first week: KBS2's Music Bank on January 7, MBC's Show! Music Core on January 8, and SBS's Inkigayo on January 9. On the second week of the song release, the group performed on Mnet's M Countdown on January 13, and KBS2's Music Bank on January 14, where they won first place in both appearances. On the third week of the song release, the group performed on Mnet's M Countdown on January 20, where they won first place.

Credits and personnel
Credits adapted from Melon.

 Kep1er – vocals
 BuildingOwner (PrismFilter) – lyrics, composition, arrangement
 Elum (PrismFilter) – lyrics, composition
 Shannon Bae – lyrics, composition
 Danke – lyrics
 Hwang Yu-bin – lyrics
 Odal Park – lyrics
 Lee Seu-ran – lyrics
 Kako – lyrics

Charts

Weekly charts

Monthly charts

Year-end charts

Certifications

Accolades

Release history

References

Kep1er songs
2022 songs
Korean-language songs
2022 debut singles
Wake One Entertainment singles